The Los Alamos United States Post Office, at 199 Central Park Sq. in Los Alamos, New Mexico, was listed on the National Register of Historic Places in 2015 as United States Post Office-Los Alamos, New Mexico.

It was built in 1948, as part of a Community Center funded by the U.S. Atomic Energy Commission (AEC).  Control of the property was transferred to the postal service in 1947, but ownership was not transferred to the USPS until 1963.

The post office has a series of ornamental thunderbird grilles in its windows, which may have been created by artist Tony Dá, son of potter Maria Martinez.

It was listed after 11 years of effort.

It was designed by architects W.C. Kruger and Associates and is a one-story and basement building with a mixture of Modern and Territorial Revival design.

References

External links

Post office buildings on the National Register of Historic Places in New Mexico
National Register of Historic Places in Los Alamos County, New Mexico
Government buildings completed in 1948